This page is a list of episodes for the American TV series Cinema Insomnia.

Cinema Insomnia is preparing for its 6th season on Roku streaming channel OSI-74, Outer Space International. A total of 90 episodes are currently available for streaming there from Seasons 1–5, 2015–2021.

List of Cinema Insomnia episodes 


See also 
 List of films in the public domain in the United States
 List of Mystery Science Theater 3000 episodes

References

External links 
Cinema Insomnia Show Information
Internet Movie Database's Episode List
Cinema Insomnia 10 Year Anniversary on Kickstarter

Cinema Insomnia
Cinema Insomnia